Brad Rowswell (born 1986) is an Australian politician. He has been a Liberal Party member of the Victorian Legislative Assembly since November 2018, representing the seat of Sandringham.

He was for a time the Shadow Assistant Minister to the Leader of the Opposition and Secretary to the Shadow Cabinet, however he was removed from this role on Matthew Guy’s return to the Liberal Party leadership in September 2021.

Early life and career
Rowswell was born at the Sandringham Hospital and grew up in the suburb of Beaumaris. He was educated at St Bede's College in Mentone.

Prior to his election to parliament, Rowswell worked as a political advisor and a communications manager for the defense contractor Raytheon.

Rowswell once studied to be a Catholic Priest.

Politics

Rowswell was preselected as the Liberal candidate for the seat of Sandringham in 2018 over former councillor Felicity Frederico. He suffered a 9.5% swing against him, but won the election by slightly over 500 votes.

While campaigning in 2017, a fundraiser for his campaign included former tennis player and anti-LGBT campaigner Margaret Court.

Rowswell was appointed Shadow Minister for Energy in March 2021 by Michael O'Brien. When Matthew Guy was returned to the leadership in September 2021, he was removed from the shadow cabinet.

Rowswell was re-elected at the 2022 Victorian state election. After the election Rowswell ran in the 2022 Victorian Liberal Party deputy leadership election.

References

Living people
Liberal Party of Australia members of the Parliament of Victoria
Members of the Victorian Legislative Assembly
21st-century Australian politicians
1986 births
Politicians from Melbourne
People from Beaumaris, Victoria